A stumbling block is a behavior or attitude that leads another to sin.

Stumbling block may also refer to:

 Stumbling block (monument), a small, cobblestone-sized memorial for a single victim of Nazism
 Stumbling block (philosophy), an object, thing, action or situation that causes an obstruction
 an obstacle